General Salmond may refer to:

Geoffrey Salmond (1878–1933), Royal Flying Corps general
James Salmond (general) (1766–1837), British East India Company major general
John Salmond (1881–1968), Royal Air Force general
William Salmond (British Army officer) (1840–1932), British Army major general

See also
Andy Salmon (born 1959), Royal Marines major general
H. L. N. Salmon (1894–1943), Canadian Army major general